is a bay located on the northern shores of the Hokuriku region of Honshu, Japan on the Sea of Japan. The bay borders Toyama and Ishikawa prefectures. The bay is known for the mirages on the horizon during the winter months and for being a spawning ground for the firefly squid. It is also one of Japan's three largest bays. Parts of the bay are within the borders of the Noto Hantō Quasi-National Park.

Geography

Border communities
Toyama Prefecture
Kurobe, Uozu, Namerikawa, Toyama, Imizu, Takaoka, Himi
Ishikawa Prefecture
Nanao

Rivers
Kurobe River, Jōganji River, Jinzū River, Shō River, etc.

References

Bays of Japan
Bays of the Sea of Japan
Landforms of Toyama Prefecture
Landforms of Ishikawa Prefecture